Hang or Hanging may refer to:

People
 Choe Hang (disambiguation), various people
 Luciano Hang (born 1962/1963), Brazilian billionaire businessman
 Ren Hang (disambiguation), various people

Law
 Hanging, a form of capital punishment

Arts, entertainment, and media

Artwork
 Hanging craft, a decorative or symbolic hanging object
 Hanging scroll, a type of decorative art

Music
 Hang (Foxygen album), a 2017 album by the indie rock band Foxygen
 Hang (Lagwagon album), an album by the punk band Lagwagon
 "Hang", a song by Avail from their 1996 album 4am Friday
 "Hang out with You", a 2016 song recorded by American singer-songwriter Mary Lambert
 "Hang", a song by Matchbox Twenty from their album Yourself or Someone Like You
 Hang (instrument), a musical instrument

Other uses
 Meat hanging, a form of beef aging
 Hang (computing), a computer malfunction
 Hang (instrument), a musical instrument
 "Hang in there", or "Hang in there, Baby", a popular catchphrase and motivational poster
 Hang On (disambiguation), multiple meanings
 Hanging topic, a linguistics concept in the information structure of a sentence

See also
 Google Hangouts, a Google communication service
 Hangnail (disambiguation)
 Limited hangout, or partial hangout, a spy term